Cleo Wright (June 23, 1915 – January 25, 1942) was an African-American cotton-mill worker who was lynched during the afternoon of January 25, 1942, after earlier being accused of attacking a white woman with a knife and attempting to sexually assault her, and subsequently stabbing a police officer in the face.

History
On January 25, 1942, in Sikeston, Missouri, a black man entered the home of a white woman, Grace Sturgeon. He attacked her with a knife, but the wounds were not life-threatening, and she survived.
Wright was found nearby, walking calmly, with a bloodstained knife in his pants. When arrested, an altercation ensued with Night Marshall Hess Perrigan, who shot Wright eight times. A mob grabbed the unconscious Wright, poured gasoline on him, and burned him in front of Smiths Chapel. Threats were made to other blacks of the city, and many fled the city. Others armed themselves and guarded the entrance to their neighborhood. Governor Forrest Donnell directed the Missouri State Highway Patrol and Sheriff John Hobbs to assign additional men to the scene. Nearly 100 residents who fled never returned to the community.
Afterwards, blacks who had armed themselves and patrolled the community opened a chapter of the NAACP, seeking protection from mob violence. The white community considered the killing justified. Church leaders, while generally negative on the righteousness of lynching, were afraid to speak out one way or the other due to the fear it would "drive a wedge" between members.

References

Further reading
Capeci, Dominic J.  The Lynching of Cleo Wright.  University Press of Kentucky, 1998.  .
Negro is Lynched by Missouri Crowd.  The New York Times, January 26, 1942.

Lynching deaths in Missouri
1942 deaths
1942 murders in the United States
1942 in Missouri
January 1942 events
Lynching victims in the United States
Murdered African-American people
People murdered in Missouri
Deaths from fire in the United States
Prisoners murdered in custody
Crimes in Missouri
Racially motivated violence against African Americans
African-American history between emancipation and the civil rights movement
Anti-black racism in the United States
African-American history of Missouri
History of racism in Missouri
New Madrid County, Missouri
People from Sikeston, Missouri
Race-related controversies in the United States